Kaul Manacha is an Indian Marathi language film directed by Bheemrao Mude. The film stars Rajesh Shringarpure, Sameer Dharmadhikari and Amruta Patki Music by Rohan-Rohan. The film was released on 21 October 2016.

Synopsis 
Cinephile school-kid Raj is obsessed with films and his female classmate Ritika; initially, everyone brushes him off, but chaos ensues when his obsessions begin to seep into his real life.

Cast 
 Rajesh Shringarpure
 Sameer Dharmadhikari
 Amruta Patki
 Girija Prabhu
 Ninand Tambde 
 Vijay Chavan
 Jaywant Wadkar
 Kamlesh Sawant
 Shweta Pendse
 Varsha Dandale
 Mausami Tondwalkar
 Vinit Bhonde

Production

Filming
Muhurat shot and formal launch was done on 6 November 2015 in Mumbai, India. Principal photography began that day, as informed by the makers. On 23 February 2016, entire shooting of the film has been wrapped up.

Soundtrack

Critical response 

Kaul Manacha film received positive reviews from critics. Shalaka Nalawade of The Times of India gave the film a rating of 3.5/5 and wrote "It gives you a social message, but does not come across as preachy, and that’s where its strength lies. A decent entertainer this one". Soumitra Pote of Maharashtra Times gave the film 2.5 stars out of 5 and wrote "This was a topic with a good storyline. If a little more work had been done on the characters, their behavior, it would have felt more relatable". Raju Chinchankar of Lokmat gave the film 2 stars out of 5 and wrote "Had the story received a stronger treatment, its impact would have been heightened". Reshma Raikwar of Loksatta wrote "There are a lot of things that have been gathered in the film, if only a few things that were left out had been caught correctly, this would have been the best film!".

References

External links
 
 

2016 films
2010s Marathi-language films
Indian drama films
Films scored by Rohan-Rohan